In the United States, increased restrictions and labeling of cannabis (legal term marijuana or marihuana) as a poison began in many states from 1906 onward, and outright prohibitions began in the 1920s. By the mid-1930s cannabis was regulated as a drug in every state, including 35 states that adopted the Uniform State Narcotic Drug Act. The first national regulation was the Marihuana Tax Act of 1937.

Cannabis was officially outlawed for any use (medical included) with the passage of the 1970 Controlled Substances Act (CSA).  Multiple efforts to reschedule cannabis under the CSA have failed, and the U.S. Supreme Court ruled in United States v. Oakland Cannabis Buyers' Cooperative and Gonzales v. Raich that the federal government has a right to regulate and criminalize cannabis, even for medical purposes.  Despite this, states and other jurisdictions have continued to implement policies that conflict with federal law, beginning with the passage of California's Proposition 215 in 1996.  By 2016 a majority of states had legalized medical cannabis, and in 2012 the first two states, Colorado and Washington, legalized recreational use.

Early history

Pre-1850s

In 1619, King James I decreed that the American colonists of Jamestown would need to step up efforts to do their fair share towards supporting England. The Virginia Company enacted the decree, asking Jamestown's land owners to grow and export 100 hemp plants to help support England's cause. Later the colonists would grow it to support its expansion in the Americas. Cannabis cultivation played a central role in the establishment of the United States. George Washington grew hemp at Mount Vernon as one of his three primary crops. The use of hemp for rope and fabric later became ubiquitous throughout the 18th and 19th centuries in the United States. Medicinal preparations of cannabis became available in American pharmacies in the 1850s following an introduction to its use in Western medicine by William O'Shaughnessy a decade earlier in 1839.

Early pharmaceutical and recreational use

Around the same time, efforts to regulate the sale of pharmaceuticals began, and laws were introduced on a state-to-state basis that created penalties for mislabeling drugs, adulterating them with undisclosed narcotics, and improper sale of those considered "poisons". Poison laws generally either required labels on the packaging indicating the harmful effects of the drugs or prohibited sale outside of licensed pharmacies and without a doctor's prescription. Those that required labeling often required the word "poison" if the drug was not issued by a pharmacy. Other regulations were prohibitions on the sale to minors, as well as restrictions on refills. Some pharmaceutical laws specifically enumerated the drugs that came under the effect of the regulations, while others did not—leaving the matter to medical experts. Those that did generally included references to cannabis, either under the category of "cannabis and its preparations" or "hemp and its preparations."

A 1905 Bulletin from the United States Department of Agriculture lists twenty-nine states with laws mentioning cannabis. Eight states and territories are listed with "sale of poisons" laws that specifically mention cannabis: North Carolina, Ohio, Wisconsin, Louisiana, Vermont, Maine, Montana; and the District of Columbia. Among those states that required a prescription for sale were Wisconsin and Louisiana. Several "sale of poison" laws did not specify restricted drugs, including in Indiana, Rhode Island, Hawaii, Nebraska, Kentucky, Mississippi, and New York. Many states did not consider cannabis a "poison" but required it be labeled.

In New York, the original law did enumerate cannabis, and was passed in 1860 following a string of suicides allegedly involving the substances later categorized as poisons. The first draft of the bill 'An act to regulate the sale of poisons' prohibited the sale of cannabis—as with the other substances—without the written order of a physician. The final bill as passed allowed the sale without a prescription so long as the purpose to which it was issued and name and address of the buyer was recorded, and in addition, all packaging of such substances—whether sold with a prescription or not—had to have the label "poison" on them in uppercase red letters. In 1862, the section which enumerated the substances was repealed with an amendatory act, though cannabis was still required to be labeled.

In some states where poison laws excluded cannabis, there were nonetheless attempts to include it. A bill introduced in 1880 in the California state legislature was titled 'An act to regulate the sale of opium and other narcotic poisons' and would have forbidden anyone to keep, sell, furnish, or give away any "preparations or mixtures made or prepared from opium, hemp, or other narcotic drugs" without a doctor's prescription at a licensed store. That bill was withdrawn in favor of one specifically aimed at opium, though further bills including hemp-based drugs were introduced in 1885 and in 1889.

Background to later restrictions (late 19th century) 

As early as 1853, recreational cannabis was listed as a "fashionable narcotic". By the 1880s, oriental-style hashish parlors were flourishing alongside opium dens, to the point that one could be found in every major city on the east coast. It was estimated there were around 500 such establishments in New York City alone.

An article in Harper's Magazine (1883), attributed to Harry Hubbell Kane, describes a hashish-house in New York frequented by a large clientele, including males and females of "the better classes," and further talks about parlors in Boston, Philadelphia and Chicago. Hemp cigarettes were reported to be used by Mexican soldiers as early as 1874.

Criminalization (1900s)

Strengthening of poison laws (1906–1938) 
The Pure Food and Drug Act was then passed by the United States Congress in 1906 and required that certain special drugs, including cannabis, be accurately labeled with contents. Previously, many drugs had been sold as patent medicines with secret ingredients or misleading labels. Even after the passage of regulations, there continued to be criticism about the availability of narcotics and around 1910 there was a wave of legislation aimed to strengthen requirements for their sale and remove what were commonly referred to as "loopholes" in poison laws. The new revisions aimed to restrict all narcotics, including cannabis, as poisons, limit their sale to pharmacies, and require doctors' prescriptions. The first instance was in the District of Columbia in 1906, under "An act to regulate the practice of pharmacy and the sale of poisons in the District of Columbia, and for other purposes". The act was updated in 1938 to the Federal Pure Food, Drug, and Cosmetics Act of 1938 which remains in effect even today, creating a legal paradox for federal sentencing. Under this act, the framework for prescription and non-prescription drugs and foods are set, along with standards as well as the enforcing agency, the Food and Drug Administration (FDA). "Goods found in violation of the law were subject to seizure and destruction at the expense of the manufacturer. That, combined with a legal requirement that all convictions be published (Notices of Judgment), proved to be important tools in the enforcement of the statute and had a deterrent effect upon would-be violators." Marijuana remains under this law defined as a "dangerous drug".

Further regulation of cannabis followed in Massachusetts (1911), New York (1914), and Maine (1914). In New York, reform legislation began under the Towns-Boylan Act, which targeted all "habit-forming drugs", restricted their sale, prohibited refills in order to prevent habituation, prohibited sale to people with a habit, and prohibited doctors who were themselves habituated from selling them. Shortly after, several amendments were passed by the New York Board of Health, including adding cannabis to the list of habit-forming drugs.

A New York Times article noted on the cannabis amendment:

In the West, the first state to include cannabis as a poison was California. The Poison Act was passed in 1907 and amended in 1909 and 1911, and in 1913 an amendatory act was made to make possession of "extracts, tinctures, or other narcotic preparations of hemp, or loco-weed, their preparations and compounds" a misdemeanor. There is no evidence that the law was ever used or intended to restrict pharmaceutical cannabis; instead it was a legislative mistake, and in 1915 another revision placed cannabis under the same restriction as other poisons. In 1914, one of the first cannabis drug raids in the nation occurred in the Mexican-American neighborhood of Sonoratown in Los Angeles, where police raided two "dream gardens" and confiscated a wagonload of cannabis.

Other states followed with marijuana laws including: Wyoming (1915); Texas (1919); Iowa (1923); Nevada (1923); Oregon (1923); Washington (1923); Arkansas (1923); Nebraska (1927); Louisiana (1927); and Colorado (1929).

One source of tensions in the western and southwestern states was the influx of Mexicans to the U.S. following the 1910 Mexican Revolution. Many Mexicans also smoked marijuana to relax after working in the fields. It was also seen as a cheaper alternative to alcohol, due to Prohibition (which went into effect nationally in 1920). Later in the 1920s, negative tensions grew between the small farms and the large farms that used cheaper Mexican labor. Shortly afterwards, the Great Depression came which increased tensions as jobs and resources became more scarce. Because of that, the passage of the initial laws is often described as a product of racism.

International Opium Convention (1925) 
In 1925, the United States supported regulation of Indian hemp, also known as hashish, in the International Opium Convention. The convention banned exportation of "Indian hemp", and the preparations derived therefrom, to countries that had prohibited its use and required importing countries to issue certificates approving the importation and stating that the shipment was required "exclusively for medical or scientific purposes". The convention did not ban trade in fibers and other similar products from European hemp, traditionally grown in the United States. According to the 1912 edition of the Swedish encyclopedia Nordisk familjebok, the European hemp grown for its fibers lacks the THC content that characterizes Indian hemp.

Uniform State Narcotic Drug Act (1925–1932) 
The Uniform State Narcotic Drug Act, first tentative draft in 1925 and fifth final version in 1932, was a result of work by the National Conference of Commissioners on Uniform State Laws. It was argued that the traffic in narcotic drugs should have the same safeguards and the same regulation in all of the states. The committee took into consideration the fact that the federal government had already passed the Harrison Act in 1914 and the Federal Import and Export Act in 1922. Many people assumed that the Harrison Act was all that was necessary. The Harrison Act, however, was a revenue-producing act and, while it provided penalties for violation, it did not give the states themselves authority to exercise police power in regard to seizure of drugs used in illicit trade, or in regard to punishment of those responsible. The act was recommended to the states for that purpose. As a result of the Uniform State Narcotic Act, the Federal Bureau of Narcotics encouraged state governments to adopt the act. By the middle of the 1930s all member states had some regulation of cannabis.

Federal Bureau of Narcotics (1930) 

The use of cannabis and other drugs came under increasing scrutiny after the formation of the Federal Bureau of Narcotics (FBN) in 1930, headed by Harry J. Anslinger as part of the government's broader push to outlaw all recreational drugs.

Anslinger claimed cannabis caused people to commit violent crimes and act irrationally and overly sexual. The FBN produced propaganda films promoting Anslinger's views and Anslinger often commented to the press regarding his views on marijuana.

The 1936 Geneva Trafficking Conventions 
In 1936 the Convention for the Suppression of the Illicit Traffic in Dangerous Drugs (1936 Trafficking Convention) was concluded in Geneva. The U.S., led by Anslinger, had attempted to include the criminalization of all activities in the treaty – cultivation, production, manufacture and distribution – related to the use of opium, coca (and its derivatives), and cannabis, for non-medical and non-scientific purposes. Many countries opposed this and the focus remained on illicit trafficking. Article 2 of the Convention called upon signatory countries to use their national criminal law systems to "severely" punish, "particularly by imprisonment or other penalties of deprivation of liberty", acts directly related to drug trafficking. The U.S. refused to sign the final version because it considered the convention too weak, especially in relation to extradition, extraterritoriality and the confiscation of trafficking profits.

Marihuana Tax Act (1937) 

The Marihuana Tax Act of 1937 effectively made possession or transfer of marijuana illegal throughout the United States under federal law, excluding medical and industrial uses, through imposition of an excise tax on all sales of hemp. Annual fees were $24 ($637 adjusted for inflation) for importers, manufacturers, and cultivators of cannabis, $1 ($24 adjusted for inflation) for medical and research purposes, and $3 ($82 adjusted for inflation) for industrial users. Detailed sales logs were required to record marihuana sales. Selling marihuana to any person who had previously paid the annual fee incurred a tax of $1 per ounce or fraction thereof; however, the tax was $100 ($2,206 adjusted for inflation) per ounce or fraction thereof to sell any person who had not registered and paid the annual fee.

The American Medical Association (AMA) opposed the act because the tax was imposed on physicians prescribing cannabis, retail pharmacists selling cannabis, and medical cannabis cultivation and manufacturing; instead of enacting the Marihuana Tax Act the AMA proposed cannabis be added to the Harrison Narcotics Tax Act. This approach was unappealing to some legislators who feared that adding a new substance to the Harrison Act would subject that act to new legal scrutiny. Since the federal government had no authority under the 10th Amendment to regulate medicines, that power being reserved by individual states in 1937, a tax was the only viable way to legislate marijuana.

After the Philippines fell to Japanese forces in 1942, the Department of Agriculture and the U.S. Army urged farmers to grow hemp fiber and tax stamps for cultivation were issued to farmers. Without any change in the Marihuana Tax Act, over 400,000 acres of hemp were cultivated between 1942 and 1945. The last commercial hemp fields were planted in Wisconsin in 1957. New York Mayor Fiorello LaGuardia, who was a strong opponent of the 1937 Marihuana Tax Act, started the LaGuardia Commission that in 1944 contradicted the earlier reports of addiction, madness, and overt sexuality.

The decision of the United States Congress to pass the Marihuana Tax Act of 1937 was based on poorly attended hearings and reports based on questionable studies. In 1936 the Federal Bureau of Narcotics (FBN) noticed an increase of reports of people smoking marijuana, which further increased in 1937. The Bureau drafted a legislative plan for Congress seeking a new law, and the head of the FBN, Harry J. Anslinger, ran a campaign against marijuana. Newspaper mogul William Randolph Hearst's empire of newspapers used the "yellow journalism" pioneered by Hearst to demonize the cannabis plant and spread a public perception that there were connections between cannabis and violent crime. Several scholars argue that the goal was to destroy the hemp industry, largely as an effort of Hearst, Andrew Mellon and the Du Pont family. They argue that with the invention of the decorticator hemp became a very cheap substitute for the wood pulp that was used in the newspaper industry. However, Hearst newspapers owed large debts to Canadian suppliers of paper, who used wood as raw material. If an alternative raw material for paper had emerged, it would have lowered the price of the paper needed to print Hearst's many newspapers—a positive thing for Hearst. Moreover, by the year 1916 there were at least five "machine brakes" for hemp and it is unlikely that in the 1930s hemp became a new threat for newspapers owners.

Mellon was Secretary of the Treasury, as well as the wealthiest man in America, and had invested heavily in nylon, DuPont's new synthetic fiber. He considered  nylon's success to depend on it replacing the traditional resource, hemp.

The company DuPont and many industrial historians dispute a link between nylon and hemp. They argue that the reason for developing nylon was to produce a fiber that could compete with silk and rayon in, for example, thin stockings for women. Silk was much more expensive than hemp and imported largely from Japan. There was more money in a substitute for silk. DuPont focused early on thin stockings for women. As a commercial product, nylon was a revolution in textiles. Strong and water-resistant, it was possible to make very thin fibers from cheap raw materials. The first sales in 1938 in New York of nylon stockings created a line with 4000 middle class women. For years to come, nylon demand was greater than DuPont could produce. And the DuPont Group was very big; it could move on if nylon had not become a success.

In 1916, United States Department of Agriculture (USDA) chief scientists Jason L. Merrill and Lyster H. Dewey created a paper, USDA Bulletin No. 404 "Hemp Hurds as Paper-Making Material", in which they stated that paper from the woody inner portion of the hemp stem broken into pieces, so called hemp hurds, was "favorable in comparison with those used with pulp wood". Merrill and Dewey's findings were not repeated in a later book by Dewey and have not been confirmed by paper production experts. The consistency of long fibers is too low in hemp hurds for commercial papermaking. Numerous machines had been devised for breaking and scutching hemp fibers, but none had been found to be fully satisfactory in actual commercial work. To produce fiber from hemp was a labor-intensive process if harvest, transport and processing are included. Technological developments decreased the labor but not sufficiently to eliminate this disadvantage.

There was also a misconception about the intoxicating effects of hemp because it has the same active substance, THC, which is in all cannabis strains. Hemp normally has a minimal amount of THC when compared to recreational cannabis strains but, in the 1930s, THC was not yet fully identified. The methods FBN used for predicting the psychoactive effect of different samples of cannabis and hemp therefore gave confusing results.

Mandatory sentencing (1952, 1956) 
Mandatory sentencing and increased punishment were enacted when the United States Congress passed the Boggs Act of 1952 and the Narcotics Control Act of 1956. The acts made a first-time cannabis possession offense a minimum of two to ten years with a fine up to $20,000; however, in 1970 Congress repealed mandatory penalties for cannabis offenses.

Controlled Substances Act (1970) 
In its 1969 Leary v. United States decision the U.S. Supreme Court held the Marijuana Tax Act to be unconstitutional, since it violated the Fifth Amendment right against self-incrimination. In response, Congress passed the Controlled Substances Act as Title II of the Comprehensive Drug Abuse Prevention and Control Act of 1970, which repealed the Marijuana Tax Act.  Although the new law did officially prohibit the use of cannabis for any purpose, it also eliminated mandatory minimum sentences and reduced simple possession of all drugs from a felony to a misdemeanor.

Under the CSA cannabis was assigned a Schedule I classification, deemed to have a high potential for abuse and no accepted medical use – thereby prohibiting even medical use of the drug.  The classification has remained since the CSA was first signed into law, despite multiple efforts to reschedule.  Other drugs in the Schedule I category include heroin, LSD, and peyote.

Reorganization (1968, 1973) 

In 1968 the United States Department of the Treasury subsidiary the Bureau of Narcotics, and the United States Department of Health, Education, and Welfare subsidiary the Bureau of Drug Abuse Control, merged to create the Bureau of Narcotics and Dangerous Drugs as a United States Department of Justice subsidiary.

In 1973 President Richard Nixon's "Reorganization Plan Number Two" proposed the creation of a single federal agency to enforce federal drug laws and Congress accepted the proposal, as there was concern regarding the growing availability of drugs. As a result, on July 1, 1973, the Bureau of Narcotics and Dangerous Drugs (BNDD) and the Office of Drug Abuse Law Enforcement (ODALE) merged to create the Drug Enforcement Administration (DEA).

Mandatory sentencing and three-strikes (1984, 1986) 
During the Reagan administration the Sentencing Reform Act provisions of the Comprehensive Crime Control Act of 1984 created the Sentencing Commission, which established mandatory sentencing guidelines. The Anti-Drug Abuse Act of 1986 reinstated mandatory prison sentences, including large scale cannabis distribution. Later an amendment created a three-strikes law, which created mandatory 25-years imprisonment for repeated serious crimes – including certain drug offenses – and allowed the death penalty to be used against "drug kingpins".

Solomon–Lautenberg amendment (1990)
The Solomon–Lautenberg amendment is a federal law enacted in 1990 that urges states to suspend the driver's license of anyone who commits a drug offense. A number of states passed laws in the early 1990s seeking to comply with the amendment, in order to avoid a penalty of reduced federal highway funds. These laws impose mandatory driver's license suspensions of at least six months for committing any type of drug offense, regardless of whether any motor vehicle was involved in the offense (thus the nickname "Smoke a joint, lose your license" laws, also referred to as "Possess a joint, lose your license" laws). An opt-out provision in the amendment allows states to avoid being penalized for non-compliance, however. As of 2021 all but three states (Alabama, Arkansas, and Florida) have formally opted out.

House Joint Resolution 117 (1998) 
By the fall of 1998, California voters had approved Proposition 215 to legalize medical cannabis, and similar measures were up for vote in several more states.  In response to these developments, House Joint Resolution 117 was passed by the U.S. House of Representatives on September 15, 1998, to declare support for "the existing Federal legal process for determining the safety and efficacy of drugs" and oppose "efforts to circumvent this process by legalizing marijuana ... for medicinal use without valid scientific evidence and [FDA] approval".  The measure passed by a 310 to 93 vote.

United States v. Oakland Cannabis Buyers' Cooperative (2001) 

Following the passage of Proposition 215, the Oakland Cannabis Buyers' Cooperative was created to "provide seriously ill patients with a safe and reliable source of medical cannabis, information, and patient support".  In January 1998, the U.S. government sued Oakland Cannabis Buyers' Cooperative for violating federal laws created as a result of the Controlled Substances Act. On May 14, 2001, the Supreme Court ruled in United States v. Oakland Cannabis Buyers' Cooperative that federal anti-drug laws do not permit an exception for medical cannabis and rejected the common-law medical necessity defense to crimes enacted under the Controlled Substances Act, because Congress concluded cannabis has "no currently accepted medical use" when the act was passed in 1970.

Gonzales v. Raich (2005) 

Gonzales v. Raich 545 U.S. 1 (2005) was a decision in which the U.S. Supreme Court ruled (6–3) that even where individuals or businesses in accordance with state-approved medical cannabis programs are lawfully cultivating, possessing, or distributing medical cannabis, such persons or businesses are violating federal marijuana laws. Therefore, under federal law violators are prosecuted because the Commerce Clause of the United States Constitution grants the federal government jurisdiction, pursuant to the U.S. Controlled Substances Act, to prosecute marijuana offenses.

In Gonzales the defendants argued that because the cannabis in question had been grown, transported, and consumed entirely within California and in compliance with California medical cannabis laws, their activity did not implicate interstate commerce, and as such could not be regulated by the federal government through the Commerce Clause.

The Supreme Court disagreed, reasoning that cannabis grown within California for medical purposes is indistinguishable from illicit marijuana and that because the intrastate medical cannabis market contributes to the interstate illicit marijuana market, the Commerce Clause applies. Even where California citizens are using medical cannabis in compliance with state law, those individuals and businesses can still be prosecuted by federal authorities for violating federal law.

To combat state-approved medical cannabis legislation, the Drug Enforcement Administration continued the routine targeting and arrests of medical cannabis patients and the seizure of medical cannabis and the business assets of growers and medical dispensaries. This was finally curtailed with the passage of the Rohrabacher–Farr amendment in 2014, although prosecutions initially continued until a pair of court rulings determined the DOJ was interpreting the amendment incorrectly.

Cole Memorandum rescinded (2018)
In January 2018, Attorney General Jeff Sessions rescinded the Cole Memorandum, an Obama-era policy that generally discouraged U.S. Attorneys from enforcing federal law against state-legal cannabis enterprises. The impact that rescinding the memo would have on enforcement activities was not immediately made clear by Justice Department officials.

Decriminalization (1970s–)

Medical use

Compassionate IND program (1978)
In 1975, a Washington D.C. resident named Robert Randall was arrested for cultivating cannabis.  Randall, who had discovered that cannabis relieved the symptoms of his glaucoma, employed a medical necessity defense at trial to justify his use of the drug.  The charges against Randall were dismissed, and as a result of an ensuing petition filed with the FDA, Randall became the first person to receive cannabis from the federal government in 1976.  After his supply was cut off in 1978, he filed a lawsuit to have it restored, setting in motion the creation of the Compassionate Investigational New Drug program shortly thereafter.  The program allowed patients with serious medical conditions to receive a regular supply of cannabis from the federal government; however, only 13 patients ended up participating due to the very complicated and drawn-out application process involved.

The Compassionate IND program was closed to new patients in 1992, due to a flood of new applications from AIDS patients and concerns that the program undercut Bush administration efforts to discourage illegal drug use.  Twenty-eight applications that had recently been approved were rescinded, and only the 13 patients who were already receiving cannabis were allowed to do so moving forward.  All but two of the patients have since died; the surviving two patients are the only persons who currently receive cannabis through the program.

Early medical cannabis laws (1978–1982)
During the late 1970s and into the early 80s, a number of states passed legislation addressing the medical use of cannabis.  New Mexico was the first to do so in 1978, and by the end of 1982 over thirty states had followed suit.  The majority of these laws sought to provide cannabis through federally-approved research programs administered by the states, using cannabis supplied by the National Institute on Drug Abuse.  Only seven states ended up implementing the programs, however, due to the large bureaucratic and regulatory obstacles involved.  Other states passed laws allowing doctors to prescribe cannabis, or reclassifying cannabis in a state's internal drug scheduling system.  Additionally, a few states passed legislation affirming the right of individuals to present a medical necessity defense at trial.  These laws were all largely ineffectual though, due to the continued prohibition of medical cannabis at the federal level.  By the mid-80s, efforts to pass new medical cannabis laws had ground to a halt, and a number of existing laws were either repealed or allowed to expire.

DEA judge recommends reclassification (1988)
In 1972, the National Organization for the Reform of Marijuana Laws petitioned the BNDD (which later became the DEA) to remove cannabis from the list of Schedule I drugs, in order to allow it to be prescribed by physicians.  After a decade of legal battles in which the DEA refused to consider the petition, public hearings were finally held on the matter beginning in 1986.  In September 1988, after two years of extensive public hearings, DEA Chief Administrative Law Judge Francis L. Young ruled in favor of moving cannabis to a Schedule II classification, finding that "Marijuana, in its natural form, is one of the safest therapeutically active substances known to man."  Young further concluded: "The evidence in this record clearly shows that marijuana has been accepted as capable of relieving the distress of great numbers of very ill people, and doing so with safety under medical supervision.  It would be unreasonable, arbitrary and capricious for DEA to continue to stand between those sufferers and the benefits of this substance in light of the evidence in this record."  As Young's ruling was only a non-binding recommendation, however, it was rejected by DEA Administrator John Lawn in December 1989.  A 1994 U.S. Court of Appeals ruling upheld the DEA's final decision.

Proposition P and first cannabis dispensaries (1991)
In 1991, 79% of San Francisco voters approved Proposition P, a non-binding ballot measure expressing support for the medical use of cannabis.  The city board of supervisors soon followed with Resolution 141-92, which urged law enforcement not to prosecute individuals using cannabis under a doctor's care (as proven by a letter from a treating physician).  The resolution enabled the open sale of cannabis to AIDS patients and others within the city, most notably through the San Francisco Cannabis Buyers Club which was operated by Dennis Peron.  Similar clubs appeared outside San Francisco in the ensuing years as other cities passed legislation to support the medical use of cannabis.  The Wo/Men's Alliance for Medical Marijuana was founded in 1993 after Santa Cruz voters approved Measure A in November 1992.  And the Oakland Cannabis Buyers' Cooperative was founded in 1995 shortly before the city council passed multiple medical cannabis resolutions.  These were the first cannabis dispensaries in the U.S., allowed to operate openly by city officials even though in violation of both state and federal law.

Compassionate Use Act of 1996
In California, following the success of Proposition P and other local initiatives, medical cannabis advocates turned attention towards reform efforts at the state level.  A pair of medical cannabis bills was approved by state legislators in 1994 and 1995; however, both of these were vetoed by Governor Pete Wilson.  Frustrated by these vetoes, medical cannabis advocates took the issue directly to the voters, collecting 775,000 signatures for qualification of a statewide ballot initiative in 1996.

On November 5, 1996, California voters approved Proposition 215 (Compassionate Use Act of 1996), making the state the first in the nation to legalize the medical use of cannabis.  The measure, approved with 56% of the vote, allowed the use, possession, and cultivation of cannabis by patients with a physician's recommendation, for treatment of cancer, anorexia, AIDS, chronic pain, spasticity, glaucoma, arthritis, migraine, or "any other illness for which marijuana provides relief".  The law also allowed patient caregivers to cultivate cannabis, and urged lawmakers to facilitate the "safe and affordable distribution of marijuana".

The passage of Proposition 215 was followed by the approval of five more medical cannabis ballot initiatives in 1998 (Washington, Oregon, Alaska, Nevada, and the District of Columbia).  Maine followed in 1999, along with Nevada (for a second time) and Colorado in 2000.  Also in 2000, Hawaii became the first state to legalize medical cannabis through an act of state legislature.

D.C. medical cannabis approved, delayed (1998)
In 1998 Washington, D.C. residents approved Initiative 59 to legalize the medical use of cannabis, but a series of amendments introduced by Rep. Bob Barr and approved by Congress prevented its implementation for over a decade.  The initial Barr amendment was enacted prior to the November 1998 election but after ballots had been printed, thereby allowing D.C. residents to vote on the initiative but preventing the results from being made public.  The amendment was challenged in court by the American Civil Liberties Union on grounds that it violated First Amendment rights, and in September 1999 U.S. District Court Judge Richard W. Roberts agreed, overturning the Barr amendment.  Rep. Barr then introduced a similar amendment which became law in November 1999, setting off a long legal battle until finally in December 2009 the Barr amendment was removed from the annual D.C. appropriations bill, allowing the original 1998 ballot initiative to move forward.  Rep. Barr, who left Congress in 2003, helped lobby for defeat of the legislation he originally authored, having reversed his earlier opposition to the medical use of cannabis.

Conant v. McCaffrey (2000)
After Proposition 215 passed, the Clinton administration reiterated its firm opposition to the medical use of cannabis, and threatened to revoke the prescription-writing abilities of doctors who recommend or prescribe the drug.  Additionally, threats were made by the administration to criminally prosecute physicians, and ban them from participating in Medicare and Medicaid.  A group of physicians challenged this policy as a violation of First Amendment rights, and in September 2000 prevailed in the case Conant v. McCaffrey, which affirmed the right of physicians to recommend (but not prescribe) cannabis.  As a result, cannabis must be recommended instead of prescribed in all states where its medical use has been legalized.

Ogden memo (2009)
In October 2009, the Ogden memo was issued by the Justice Department, advising U.S. attorneys to only prosecute medical cannabis providers who violate state law or engage in other federally-illegal activity (such as money laundering or illegal use of firearms).  The memo did not have the effect that many expected, however, as raids on medical cannabis providers actually increased in frequency following its release.  Prompted by public outcry and requests for clarification from numerous elected officials, a new memo was issued by Deputy Attorney General James M. Cole in June 2011.  The 2011 Cole memo insisted that the 2009 Ogden memo was being adhered to, and that the Ogden memo's protections applied only to individual patients and not commercial operations.  The crackdown on medical cannabis continued following the release of the 2011 memo, but was tempered somewhat by the issuance of a new Cole memo in 2013, which advised a more deferential approach towards the states (similar in nature to how the 2009 Ogden memo was widely interpreted).

Rohrabacher–Farr amendment (2014) 
In response to increased raids on medical cannabis providers, Congress passed the Rohrabacher–Farr amendment in 2014, to prohibit federal prosecution of individuals acting in accordance with state medical cannabis laws.  The amendment passed the House by a 219–189 vote in May 2014, and was signed into law in December as part of an omnibus spending bill.  It was renewed following a 242–186 House vote in 2015, and has since been included in a long series of spending bills approved by Congress.

After the amendment's 2014 enactment, the Justice Department initially continued to prosecute medical cannabis providers based on a new interpretation of the amendment that was being employed.  U.S. District Judge Charles Breyer ruled against the DOJ in October 2015, however, stating that the interpretation "defies language and logic" and "tortures the plain meaning of the statute", and was "counterintuitive and opportunistic".  The Ninth Circuit Court of Appeals similarly rejected the DOJ's arguments in an August 2016 ruling.

Medical Marijuana and Cannabidiol Research Expansion Act (2022)
In December 2022, President Joe Biden signed into law the Medical Marijuana and Cannabidiol Research Expansion Act, the first standalone cannabis reform bill enacted at the federal level.  The bill contained provisions to expedite approval for cannabis research and the production of cannabis for research purposes, require the Department of Health and Human Services to investigate the medical utility of cannabis and barriers that exist to conducting research, require the Attorney General to conduct an annual review to ensure that cannabis is being adequately produced for research purposes, and clarify that it "shall not be a violation of the Controlled Substances Act for a State-licensed physician to discuss the currently known potential harms and benefits of marijuana ... as a treatment with the patient", among other reforms.

Non-medical use

Shafer Commission (1972)
Following the passage of the Comprehensive Drug Abuse Prevention and Control Act of 1970, a commission was formed under decree of the act to study the rising use of cannabis in America, and subsequently make policy recommendations.  Formally known as the National Commission on Marihuana and Drug Abuse, the Shafer Commission – led by former Pennsylvania governor Raymond P. Shafer – determined in its March 1972 report to the President and Congress that the societal harms caused by cannabis were limited, and recommended removal of criminal penalties for possession and distribution of small amounts of the drug.  Although no federal reforms resulted, the report's findings helped influence the passage of decriminalization laws in a number of states during the 1970s.

California Marijuana Initiative (1972)
In 1972, California became the first state to vote on a ballot measure attempting to legalize cannabis.  Proposition 19 – the California Marijuana Initiative – sought to legalize the use, possession, and cultivation of cannabis, but did not allow for commercial sale.  It was ultimately defeated by a wide margin (33–67%), but supporters were encouraged by the results, which provided momentum to other reform efforts in California in subsequent years.

First wave of decriminalization (1973–1978)
In 1973 Oregon became the first state to decriminalize cannabis, reducing the penalty for up to one ounce to a $100 fine.  States that decriminalized in the following years were: Alaska (1975), Maine (1975), Colorado (1975), California (1975), Ohio (1975), Minnesota (1976), Mississippi (1977), New York (1977), North Carolina (1977), and Nebraska (1978).  NORML was actively involved in helping to pass these laws, lobbying in support of legislation and paying for decriminalization proponents (including members of the Shafer Commission) to travel to various states to testify.

Some cities also passed decriminalization laws in the 1970s, such as Ann Arbor in 1972 and Madison in 1977.  Additionally, San Francisco voters approved a non-binding measure in 1978 to effectively legalize cannabis, but mayor George Moscone was assassinated shortly afterwards and the initiative was subsequently disregarded.

Ravin v. State (1975)

Ravin v. State was a 1975 decision by the Alaska Supreme Court that held the Alaska Constitution's right to privacy protects an adult's ability to use and possess a small amount of cannabis in the home for personal use. The Alaska Supreme Court thereby became the first—and only—state or federal court to announce a constitutional privacy right that protects some level of cannabis use and possession.  This policy of effective legalization remained in place until it was overridden by a 1990 ballot initiative that recriminalized cannabis in the state.

Second wave of decriminalization (2000s–)
In 2001, Nevada became the first state in over two decades to decriminalize cannabis.  In the following years, major cities across the U.S. began to either decriminalize cannabis or make enforcement of cannabis laws the lowest priority.  Among the first cities to do so were Seattle (2003), Oakland (2004), Denver (2005), and San Francisco (2006).  The trend continued with Massachusetts decriminalizing in 2008, followed by Connecticut (2011), Rhode Island (2012), Vermont (2013), the District of Columbia (2014), Maryland (2014), Missouri (2014), the U.S. Virgin Islands (2014), Delaware (2015), Illinois (2016), and New Hampshire (2017), New Mexico (2019), North Dakota (2019), Hawaii (2019), and Virginia (2020).

First two states legalize (2012)

On November 6, 2012, Colorado and Washington became the first states to legalize recreational use of cannabis when voters approved Colorado Amendment 64 and Washington Initiative 502. Each regulated cannabis in a way similar to alcohol, allowing possession of up to an ounce for adults ages 21 and older, with DUID provisions similar to those against drunk driving. Unlike Initiative 502, Amendment 64 allowed for personal cultivation of up to six plants. Both allowed for commercial cultivation and sales, subject to regulation and taxes.

Cole Memorandum (2013)
After the first states legalized in 2012, the Justice Department issued the Cole Memorandum in August 2013, seeking to clarify how federal law would be enforced.  The memo specified eight conditions which would merit enforcement of federal law, such as the distribution of cannabis to minors or the diversion of cannabis across state borders.  Aside from these situations, the memo generally allowed for the commercial distribution of cannabis in states where such activity has been legalized.  The Cole memo was later rescinded by Attorney General Jeff Sessions in 2018, introducing uncertainty into how federal law would be enforced.

Two more states plus D.C. legalize (2014)
In November 2014, the states of Alaska (Measure 2) and Oregon (Ballot Measure 91) along with Washington D.C. (Initiative 71) legalized the recreational use of cannabis.  These laws were similar in nature to those of Colorado and Washington, except the D.C. initiative did not contain an allowance for commercial sale.  A rider attached to the 2014 "Cromnibus" bill further prevented D.C. council members from enacting legislation to allow for commercial sale.

Indian Reservation legalization allowed (2014) 
In December 2014, the Justice Department announced a policy to allow recognized Indian tribes to legalize the use and sale of cannabis on American Indian reservations.  The laws on reservations are allowed to be different from state and federal laws, and as has been the case with state recreational legalization the federal government said it would not intervene as long as strict controls are maintained.  In 2015, the Flandreau Santee Sioux Tribe (of South Dakota) voted to legalize the recreational use of cannabis.  Others such as Yakama Nation and the Oglala Sioux Tribal Council have rejected legalization on their reservations.

Four more states legalize (2016)
In November 2016, the number of legal states doubled as four more states passed ballot measures to legalize cannabis: California, Nevada, Massachusetts, and Maine.  This included the nation's most populous state (California), while Massachusetts and Maine became the first eastern states to legalize.

First state legalizes through legislature (2018)
In January 2018, Vermont became the first state to legalize through an act of legislature, as opposed to ballot initiative with the previous eight states.  Also differentiating Vermont's law is the fact that it does not allow for commercial sale, although a commission was set up to explore the possibility.  The bill was signed into law by Republican governor Phil Scott.

2018 federal farm bill

The 2018 United States farm bill contained provisions legalizing hemp production with low levels of delta-9-THC. It may have inadvertently allowed cultivation of hemp plants with high levels of delta-8-THC, which is also psychoactive and has since become more popular recreationally across the U.S.

First state legalizes commercial sale through legislature (2019)
In June 2019, Illinois became the second state to legalize through an act of legislature and the first to legalize commercial sale in this way. The bill was signed into law by Gov. J. B. Pritzker after passing the House 66–47 and the Senate 38–17.

Four more states vote to legalize (2020)
In November 2020, four states voted to legalize recreational marijuana via ballot measures: Arizona, Montana, New Jersey, and South Dakota. South Dakota's legalization amendment was subsequently overturned in court. Notably, South Dakota would have become the first state to legalize recreational use without first legalizing medical use and became the first state to have a legalization referendum overturned. With these approvals, recreational cannabis became legal in 14 states.

House approves MORE Act (2020)
On December 4, 2020, the House of Representatives voted 228–164 to approve the Marijuana Opportunity Reinvestment and Expungement (MORE) Act. Included in the act were provisions to legalize cannabis at the federal level by removing it from the Controlled Substances Act, expunge cannabis offenses for non-violent offenders, and impose a federal tax on cannabis products (which would be used to fund restorative justice programs). Prior to the vote, neither chamber of Congress had voted on a cannabis legalization bill before.

Legalization timeline

See also 

 Cannabis in the United States
 Timeline of cannabis laws in the United States
 Legality of cannabis by U.S. jurisdiction
 History of cannabis
 Single Convention on Narcotic Drugs

References

Further reading 
 
 
 United States. Congress. Senate. (2013). Conflicts between State and Federal Marijuana Laws: Hearing before the Committee on the Judiciary, United States Senate, One Hundred Thirteenth Congress, First Session, Tuesday, September 10, 2013. Washington, DC: U.S. Government Publishing Office, 2015.

Articles containing video clips
Cannabis in the United States
Cannabis law in the United States
Cannabis law reform in the United States
Drug control law in the United States
Drug policy of the United States
United States
History of drug control